Hoàng Thị Phương Giang is a wushu taolu athlete from Vietnam. She made her international debut with a bronze medal victory at the 2011 Southeast Asian Games. Her most notable victories include a bronze medal in women's changquan at the 2018 Asian Games, and gold medals in the 2013 and 2017 Southeast Asian Games. Hoàng is also a four-time medalist in the World Wushu Championships, double bronze medalist in the Taolu World Cup, and double silver medalist in the Asian Wushu Championships.

See also 

 List of Asian Games medalists in wushu

References 

Living people
Vietnamese wushu practitioners
Wushu practitioners at the 2018 Asian Games
Wushu practitioners at the 2014 Asian Games
Medalists at the 2018 Asian Games
Asian Games medalists in wushu
Asian Games bronze medalists for Vietnam
Southeast Asian Games medalists in wushu
Southeast Asian Games gold medalists for Vietnam
Southeast Asian Games bronze medalists for Vietnam
Competitors at the 2011 Southeast Asian Games
Competitors at the 2013 Southeast Asian Games
Competitors at the 2017 Southeast Asian Games
Year of birth missing (living people)
Competitors at the 2021 Southeast Asian Games